The  is the prefectural parliament of Iwate Prefecture, Japan.

Its 48 members are elected every four years in 16 districts by single non-transferable vote.

The assembly is responsible for enacting and amending prefectural ordinances, approving the budget and voting on important administrative appointments made by the governor including the vice governors.

Iwate is one of three prefectures whose assemblies are currently led by the DJP majority. The others are the Tokyo Metropolitan Assembly and the Mie Prefectural Assembly.

Members
As of 20 September 2019:

References

External links 

Prefectural assemblies of Japan
 
Tōhoku region
1878 establishments in Japan